Joseph A. Foster (born June 10, 1959) is an American politician who served as the 29th Attorney General of New Hampshire from 2013 to 2017. He was formerly a Democratic member of the New Hampshire Senate, representing the 13th district from 2002 until 2008 and served as the State Senate Majority Leader in 2007 and 2008. Previously he was a member of the New Hampshire House of Representatives from 1994 through 1998. On April 17, 2013 he was confirmed to the office of New Hampshire Attorney General. He took office on May 15, 2013, succeeding Michael A. Delaney who decided not to seek reappointment by Governor Maggie Hassan at the end of his term, and instead took Foster's old position at his law firm. In 2013, Foster was described as a potential Congressional candidate.

References

External links
New Hampshire Department of Justice
Project Vote Smart - Senator Joseph A. 'Joe' Foster (NH) profile
Follow the Money - Joseph Foster
2006 2004 2002 campaign contributions

1959 births
21st-century American politicians
Living people
Members of the New Hampshire House of Representatives
George Washington University Law School alumni
New Hampshire Attorneys General
New Hampshire state senators
Tufts University alumni